Isabel Egenton Ostrander  (1883–1924) was a mystery writer of the early twentieth century who used her own name and the pseudonyms Robert Orr Chipperfield, David Fox, and Douglas Grant. Christopher B. Booth is sometimes (falsely) credited as a pseudonym of hers. 
She was born in New York City to Thomas E Ostrander and Harriet Elizabeth Bradbrook. Her Ostrander pedigree goes back to seventeenth-century Kingston, New York. She married songwriter Arthur Lamb in June 1907 and filed for divorce 11 months later.

In the discussions of which writer invented the blind detective, Ostrander is one of the candidates.

The first book publication of her Damon Gaunt is a 1915 novel At One-Thirty, but there might be a misplaced earlier short story: periodical publication of many mystery short story writers is often lost or partial.  For example, blind detective Thornley Colton appeared in some short stories in People's Ideal Fiction Magazine in early 1913 that weren't collected in book form until 1915, while Max Carrados by Ernest Bramah reached the periodicals in 1913, but anthologization in 1914. In no case is bibliography complete for periodicals, and either might be the first, though Max Carrados was the first in book publication.

In the 1920s, Ostrander was notable enough that Agatha Christie parodied her in her Tommy and Tuppence anthology, Partners in Crime. We find Tommy and Tuppence modeling their detective skills after Ostrander's characters, McCarty and Riordan.

Bibliography 

"The One Who Knew," The All-Story, Oct, Nov, Christmas 1911, Jan, Feb 1912  
"The Heritage of Cain," The Cavalier, Mar 30, Apr 6, Apr 13, Apr 20, Apr 27, May 4, May 11, 1912
"The Affair Across the Street," The Cavalier, Sep 13, Sep 20 1913
"Eyes That Saw Not," The Cavalier, Feb 14, Feb 21, Feb 28, Mar 7 1914
"The Man Who Died," All-Story Cavalier Weekly, Dec 12 1914
 At One-Thirty, a Damon Gaunt novel, Grosset, 1915
"The Crevice" [with William J. Burns], The Blue Book Magazine, Jan, May, Jun, Jul 1915
"Mystery of the Poison Pen," All-Story Weekly, May 5, May 12, 1917
"Between Heaven and Earth," All-Story Weekly, Jun 9, Jul 7 1917
"The Fifth Ace," The Argosy, Dec 15 1917 as Douglas Grant
"Suspense, " All-Story Weekly, Apr 6, Apr 13, Apr 20, Apr 27 1918
"Booty," The Argosy, Nov 16 1918  as Douglas Grant
The Island of Intrigue, novel, 1918, basis for the 1919 film, The Island of Intrigue
"The Single Trace, Argosy, Sep 13 1919  as Douglas Grant
"Ashes to Ashes,"  All-Story Weekly, Sep 27, Oct 4, Oct 18, Oct 25, Nov 1 1919
"Anything Once," Argosy, Apr 10 1920  as Douglas Grant
"The Shadowers / 1: The Man Who Convicted Himself,"  All-Story Weekly, May 1, May 8, 1920 as David Fox.
"How Many Cards?,"  Argosy All-Story Weekly, Aug 7 1920
"Two-Gun Sue," Argosy All-Story Weekly, Mar 4 1922  as Douglas Grant
"The Doom Dealer,"  Argosy All-Story Weekly, Mar 24 1923  as David Fox.
"Annihilation,"  Argosy All-Story Weekly, Nov 17, Nov 24, Dec 22, Dec 29 1923
"Bright Lights,"  Argosy All-Story Weekly, Dec 22, Dec 29 1923 as Robert Orr Chipperfield
"Liberation, " Argosy All-Story Weekly, Jul 19 1924
 The Sleeping Cat, Burt, 1926
 The Mathematics of Guilt, McBride, 1926

References

External links
 
 
 
 

1883 births
1924 deaths
Women mystery writers
20th-century American women writers
20th-century American short story writers
Pseudonymous women writers
American mystery writers
American women short story writers
20th-century pseudonymous writers